Markus Kleinheinz (born August 27, 1976) is an Austrian luger who competed between 1994 and 2006. He won a bronze medal in the mixed team event at the 1995 FIL World Luge Championships in Lillehammer, Norway.

Kleinheinz also competed in three Winter Olympics, earning his best finish of fifth in the men's singles event at Nagano in 1998.

He was overall Luge World Cup champion in men's singles in 2002-03.

References
FIL-Luge profile
Hickok sports information on World champions in luge and skeleton.
List of men's singles luge World Cup champions since 1978.

External links
 

1976 births
Living people
Austrian male lugers
Olympic lugers of Austria
Lugers at the 1998 Winter Olympics
Lugers at the 2002 Winter Olympics
Lugers at the 2006 Winter Olympics